Eupinivora unicolora is a species of moth of the family Tortricidae. It is found in the mountains of Durango in Mexico.

The length of the forewings is 7–9 mm for males and 8–9 mm for females. The forewings are nearly uniform rust, with a narrow cream blotch in distal portion of the discal cell and a diffuse area of cream scales at the mid-termen. The hindwings are pale greyish brown.

Larvae were reared on Pinus arizonica var. copperi.

Etymology
The species name refers to the nearly uniform rust colour of the forewing.

References

Moths described in 2013
Cochylini